The Gaulish language, and presumably its many dialects and closely allied sister languages, left a few hundred words in French and many more in nearby Romance languages, i.e. Franco-Provençal (Eastern France and Western Switzerland), Occitan (Southern France), Catalan, Romansch, Gallo-Italic (Northern Italy), and many of the regional languages of northern France and Belgium collectively known as langues d'oïl (e.g. Walloon, Norman, Gallo, Picard, Bourguignon, and Poitevin).

What follows is a list of inherited French words, past and present, along with words in neighboring or related languages, all borrowed from the Gaulish language (or more precisely from a substrate of Gaulish).

Modern French

A-B

Old French

Regional Languages (patois) and Neighboring Languages

See also
History of French
List of Spanish words of Celtic origin
List of Galician words of Celtic origin
List of French words of Germanic origin

Bibliography 
 Delamarre, Xavier. Dictionnaire de la langue gauloise: Une approche linguistique du vieux-celtique continental, 2nd edn. Paris: Errance, 2003 (1st edn. 2001).
 Deshayes, Albert. Dictionnaire étymologique du breton. Douarnenez, France: Le Chasse-Marée, 2003.
 Dottin, Georges. La langue gauloise: Grammaire, textes et glossaire, preface de François Falc'hun. Paris: C. Klincksieck, 1920 (reprint Geneva, 1985).
 Lambert, Pierre-Yves. La Langue gauloise. Paris: Errance, 1994.
 Savignac, Jean-Paul. Dictionnaire français-gaulois. Paris: La Différence, 2004.
 von Wartburg, Walther. Französisches Etymologisches Wörterbuch. 25 vols. Bonn: Klopp; Heidelberg: Carl Winter; Leipzig–Berlin: Teubner; Basel: R. G. Zbinden, 1922–67.

References 

Gaulish
French
French Gaulish
Language comparison